Dana Medřická (11 July 1920 – 21 January 1983) was a Czech film actress. She appeared in more than 60 films between 1944 and 1983.

Selected filmography
 Černí myslivci (1945)
 Guard 13 (1946)
 Getting on in the World (1948)
 Lidé z maringotek (1966)
 Who Wants to Kill Jessie? (1966)
 Day for My Love (1976)
 The Tailor from Ulm (1978)
 Day of the Idiots (1981)

References

External links
 

1920 births
1983 deaths
Czech film actresses
Actresses from Prague
Czechoslovak film actresses